Ghosi Lok Sabha constituency is one of the 80 Lok Sabha (parliamentary) constituencies in Uttar Pradesh state in northern India.Currently Atul Rai is representating in Parliament of India

Assembly segments
Presently, Ghosi Lok Sabha constituency comprises five Vidhan Sabha (legislative assembly) segments. These are:

Members of Parliament

Election results

See also
 Mau district
 List of Constituencies of the Lok Sabha

External links
 Ghosi Lok Sabha - ResultUniversity

Notes

Lok Sabha constituencies in Uttar Pradesh
Mau district